Siwash is a Chinook Jargon word for native peoples, derived from the French  ("wild"). The term may also refer to:

 Siwash College, a fictional school in the stories of George H. Fitch
 Siwash Creek (British Columbia), Canada
 Siwash sweater, another name for a Cowichan sweater, which is made with Cowichan knitting
 Siwash Rock, a rock outcropping in Vancouver, British Columbia, Canada
 USS Siwash (SP-12), a United States Navy patrol vessel in commission from 1917 to 1919
 Naswhito Creek, British Columbia, Canada, also called Siwash

See also
 
 
 Sivash, a system of lagoons on the west coast of the Sea of Azov

Chinook Jargon